In mathematics, the infinite series , also written

is sometimes called Grandi's series, after Italian mathematician, philosopher, and priest Guido Grandi, who gave a memorable treatment of the series in 1703. It is a divergent series, meaning that it lacks a sum in the usual sense. On the other hand, its Cesàro sum is 1/2.

Unrigorous methods
One obvious method to attack the series
1 − 1 + 1 − 1 + 1 − 1 + 1 − 1 + ...
is to treat it like a telescoping series and perform the subtractions in place:

(1 − 1) + (1 − 1) + (1 − 1) + ... = 0 + 0 + 0 + ... = 0.

On the other hand, a similar bracketing procedure leads to the apparently contradictory result
1 + (−1 + 1) + (−1 + 1) + (−1 + 1) + ... = 1 + 0 + 0 + 0 + ... = 1.

Thus, by applying parentheses to Grandi's series in different ways, one can obtain either 0 or 1 as a "value". (Variations of this idea, called the Eilenberg–Mazur swindle, are sometimes used in knot theory and algebra.)

Treating Grandi's series as a divergent geometric series and using the same algebraic methods that evaluate convergent geometric series to obtain a third value:
S = 1 − 1 + 1 − 1 + ..., so
1 − S = 1 − (1 − 1 + 1 − 1 + ...) = 1 − 1 + 1 − 1 + ... = S
1 − S = S
1 = 2S,
resulting in S = . The same conclusion results from calculating −S, subtracting the result from S, and solving 2S = 1.

The above manipulations do not consider what the sum of a series actually means and how said algebraic methods can be applied to divergent geometric series. Still, to the extent that it is important to be able to bracket series at will, and that it is more important to be able to perform arithmetic with them, one can arrive at two conclusions:
The series 1 − 1 + 1 − 1 + ... has no sum.
...but its sum should be .
In fact, both of these statements can be made precise and formally proven, but only using well-defined mathematical concepts that arose in the 19th century. After the late 17th-century introduction of calculus in Europe, but before the advent of modern rigor, the tension between these answers fueled what has been characterized as an "endless" and "violent" dispute between mathematicians.

Relation to the geometric series 
For any number  in the interval , the sum to infinity of a geometric series can be evaluated via

For any , one thus finds

and so the limit  of series evaluations is

However, as mentioned, the series obtained by switching the limits, 

is divergent.

Early ideas

Divergence
In modern mathematics, the sum of an infinite series is defined to be the limit of the sequence of its partial sums, if it exists. Therefore, Grandi's series is divergent.

It can be shown that it is not valid to perform many seemingly innocuous operations on a series, such as reordering individual terms, unless the series is absolutely convergent. Otherwise these operations can alter the result of summation. Further, the terms of Grandi's series can be rearranged to have its accumulation points at any interval of two or more consecutive integer numbers, not only 0 or 1. For instance, the series

(in which, after five initial +1 terms, the terms alternate in pairs of +1 and −1 terms–the infinitude of both +1’s and -1’s allows any finite number of 1’s or -1’s to be prepended, by Hilbert's paradox of the Grand Hotel) is a permutation of Grandi's series in which each value in the rearranged series corresponds to a value that is at most four positions away from it in the original series; its accumulation points are 3, 4, and 5.

Education

Cognitive impact
Around 1987, Anna Sierpińska introduced Grandi's series to a group of 17-year-old precalculus students at a Warsaw lyceum. She focused on humanities students with the expectation that their mathematical experience would be less significant than that of their peers studying mathematics and physics, so the epistemological obstacles they exhibit would be more representative of the obstacles that may still be present in lyceum students.

Sierpińska initially expected the students to balk at assigning a value to Grandi's series, at which point she could shock them by claiming that  as a result of the geometric series formula. Ideally, by searching for the error in reasoning and by investigating the formula for various common ratios, the students would "notice that there are two kinds of series and an implicit conception of convergence will be born." However, the students showed no shock at being told that  or even that . Sierpińska remarks that a priori, the students' reaction shouldn't be too surprising given that Leibniz and Grandi thought 1⁄2 to be a plausible result;

"A posteriori, however, the explanation of this lack of shock on the part of the students may be somewhat different. They accepted calmly the absurdity because, after all, 'mathematics is completely abstract and far from reality', and 'with those mathematical transformations you can prove all kinds of nonsense', as one of the boys later said."

The students were ultimately not immune to the question of convergence; Sierpińska succeeded in engaging them in the issue by linking it to decimal expansions the following day. As soon as 0.999... = 1 caught the students by surprise, the rest of her material "went past their ears".

Preconceptions
In another study conducted in Treviso, Italy around the year 2000, third-year and fourth-year Liceo Scientifico pupils (between 16 and 18 years old) were given cards asking the following:

"In 1703, the mathematician Guido Grandi studied the addition: 1 – 1 + 1 – 1 + ... (addends, infinitely many, are always +1 and –1). What is your opinion about it?"

The students had been introduced to the idea of an infinite set, but they had no prior experience with infinite series. They were given ten minutes without books or calculators. The 88 responses were categorized as follows:

(26) the result is 0
(18) the result can be either 0 or 1
(5) the result does not exist
(4) the result is 1⁄2
(3) the result is 1
(2) the result is infinite
(30) no answer

The researcher, Giorgio Bagni, interviewed several of the students to determine their reasoning. Some 16 of them justified an answer of 0 using logic similar to that of Grandi and Riccati. Others justified 1⁄2 as being the average of 0 and 1. Bagni notes that their reasoning, while similar to Leibniz's, lacks the probabilistic basis that was so important to 18th-century mathematics. He concludes that the responses are consistent with a link between historical development and individual development, although the cultural context is different.

Prospects
Joel Lehmann describes the process of distinguishing between different sum concepts as building a bridge over a conceptual crevasse: the confusion over divergence that dogged 18th-century mathematics.

"Since series are generally presented without history and separate from applications, the student must wonder not only "What are these things?" but also "Why are we doing this?" The preoccupation with determining convergence but not the sum makes the whole process seem artificial and pointless to many students—and instructors as well."

As a result, many students develop an attitude similar to Euler's:
"...problems that arise naturally (i.e., from nature) do have solutions, so the assumption that things will work out eventually is justified experimentally without the need for existence sorts of proof. Assume everything is okay, and if the arrived-at solution works, you were probably right, or at least right enough. ...so why bother with the details that only show up in homework problems?"

Lehmann recommends meeting this objection with the same example that was advanced against Euler's treatment of Grandi's series by Callet.

Summability

Related problems

The series 1 − 2 + 3 − 4 + 5 − 6 + 7 − 8 + .... This is the square of the value most summation methods assign to Grandi's series, which is reasonable as it can be viewed as the Cauchy product of two copies of Grandi's series.

See also
 1 − 1 + 2 − 6 + 24 − 120 + · · ·
 1 + 1 + 1 + 1 + · · ·
 1 − 2 + 3 − 4 + · · ·
 1 + 2 + 3 + 4 + · · ·
 1 + 2 + 4 + 8 + · · ·
 1 − 2 + 4 − 8 + ⋯
 Ramanujan summation
 Cesàro summation
 Thomson's lamp

Notes

References

External links
One minus one plus one minus one – Numberphile, Grandi's series

 
Divergent series
Geometric series
1 (number)
Mathematical paradoxes
Parity (mathematics)